Kreis Fellin (Viljandi kreis, Феллинский уезд) was one of the nine subdivisions of the Governorate of Livonia of the Russian Empire. It was situated in the northern part of the governorate (in present-day southern Estonia). Its capital was Viljandi (Fellin). The territory of Kreis Fellin corresponds to the most part of the present-day Viljandi County and parts of Järva, Jõgeva and Valga counties.

Demographics
At the time of the Russian Empire Census of 1897, Kreis Fellin had a population of 99,747. Of these, 97.1% spoke Estonian, 1.8% German, 0.5% Russian, 0.3% Yiddish, 0.1% Latvian and 0.1% Romani as their native language.

References